Dasypolia is a genus of moths of the family Noctuidae. The genus was erected by Achille Guenée in 1852.

Species
 Dasypolia acrophila (Hampson, 1906)
 Dasypolia afghana Boursin, 1968
 Dasypolia akbar Boursin, 1967
 Dasypolia akkeregeshena Ronkay, Ronkay, Gyulai & Pekarsky, 2014 TL: West Kazakhstan, Akkeregeshen Plateau
 Dasypolia alpina (Draudt, 1950)
 Dasypolia altissima Hacker & Moberg, 1988
 Dasypolia anartinus (Püngeler, 1901)
 Dasypolia atrox Hacker & Peks, 1993
 Dasypolia bicolor Hreblay & Ronkay, 1995
 Dasypolia confusa Hreblay & Ronkay, 1995
 Dasypolia conistroides Hreblay & Ronkay, 1995
 Dasypolia delineata Hreblay & Ronkay, 1998
 Dasypolia diva Ronkay & Varga, 1990
 Dasypolia eberti Boursin, 1967
 Dasypolia echinata Hreblay & Ronkay, 1998
 Dasypolia episcopalis Boursin, 1967
 Dasypolia esseri Fibiger, 1993
 Dasypolia exprimata Staudinger, 1896
 Dasypolia fani Staudinger, 1892
 Dasypolia ferdinandi Rühl, 1892
 Dasypolia fibigeri Hacker & Moberg, 1988
 Dasypolia flavitincta Hreblay & Ronkay, 1995
 Dasypolia fraterna Bang-Haas, 1912
 Dasypolia fugitiva Hacker & Peks, 1993
 Dasypolia gerbillus Alphéraky, 1892
 Dasypolia gransoni Ronkay & Nekrasov, 1995
 Dasypolia grisea (Moore, 1882)
 Dasypolia honeyi Ronkay & Zilli, 1993
 Dasypolia informis (Walker, [1857])
 Dasypolia ipaykala Ronkay, Varga & Hreblay, 1998
 Dasypolia isotima (Püngeler, 1914)
 Dasypolia jumla Hreblay & Ronkay, 1999
 Dasypolia khangari Hreblay & Ronkay, 1999
 Dasypolia lama Staudinger, 1896
 Dasypolia leptographa Hreblay & Ronkay, 1995
 Dasypolia leta Hreblay & Ronkay, 1999
 Dasypolia leucocera (Hampson, 1894)
 Dasypolia lithophila (Kapur, 1962)
 Dasypolia magnifica Hacker & Peks, 1993
 Dasypolia melancholica Hacker & Peks, 1993
 Dasypolia mimetica Ronkay, 1995
 Dasypolia minuta Ronkay, Varga & Behounek 1992
 Dasypolia mitis Püngeler, 1906
 Dasypolia monogramma Hreblay & Ronkay, 1995
 Dasypolia monotona Gyulai & Ronkay, 1995
 Dasypolia nebulosa Ronkay & Varga, 1985
 Dasypolia nivalis Hreblay & Ronkay, 1995
 Dasypolia obsoleta Hreblay & Ronkay, 1995
 Dasypolia orogena Hreblay & Ronkay, 1995
 Dasypolia owadai Hreblay & Ronkay, 1998
 Dasypolia peksi Hacker, 1993
 Dasypolia picurka Hreblay & Ronkay, 1995
 Dasypolia polianus (Staudinger, 1889)
 Dasypolia psathyra Boursin, 1967
 Dasypolia puengeleri Hacker & Peks, 1993
 Dasypolia pygmaea Hreblay & Ronkay, 1995
 Dasypolia rasilis (Püngeler, 1900)
 Dasypolia rjabovi (Bundel, 1966)
 Dasypolia ronkaygabori Hreblay & Ronkay, 1999
 Dasypolia rufatrox Hreblay & Ronkay, 1995
 Dasypolia sacelli (Staudinger, 1896)
 Dasypolia sherpa Hreblay & Ronkay, 1999
 Dasypolia shugnana Varga, 1982
 Dasypolia simillima Hacker & Peks, 1993
 Dasypolia templi (Thunberg, 1792)
 Dasypolia tertia Ronkay & Nekrasov, 1995
 Dasypolia timoi Fibiger & K.Nupponen, 2006
 Dasypolia tinsangla Hreblay & Ronkay, 1999
 Dasypolia transcaucasica Ronkay & Varga, 1985
 Dasypolia tsheringi Hreblay & Ronkay, 1995
 Dasypolia unicata Hreblay & Ronkay, 1995
 Dasypolia tuektiensis Zolotarenko, 1993
 Dasypolia ursina Hreblay & Ronkay, 1995
 Dasypolia vargai Ronkay & Plante, 1992
 Dasypolia vera Ronkay & Szabóky, 1995
 Dasypolia vignai Ronkay & Zilli, 1993
 Dasypolia volynkini Ronkay, Ronkay, Gyulai & Pekarsky, 2014 TL: Kazakhstan, Sary-Su river
 Dasypolia yeti (Hacker & Peks, 1993)
 Dasypolia zolotuhini Ronkay, Ronkay, Gyulai & Pekarsky, 2014 TL: Uzbekistan, Prov. Tashkent, Chatkal Reserve

References

 Nupponen, K. & Fibiger, M. (2006). "Additions and corrections to the list of Bombyces, Sphinges and Noctuidae of the Southern Ural Mountains. Part 1. (Lepidoptera: Lasiocampidae, Lemoniidae, Sphingidae, Notodontidae, Noctuidae, Pantheidae, Lymantriidae, Nolidae, Arctiidae)." Esperiana Buchreihe zur Entomologie. 12: 167-195.
 Ronkay, G., Ronkay, L. & Gyulai, P. (2014). "New Xyleninae and Psaphidinae species from Asia, with special reference to the Central and Inner Asiatic Dasypolia Guenée, 1852 (Lepidoptera, Noctuidae)." Fibigeriana Supplement: Volume 2. 141–173 pp. color plate 292–297 pp.

Cuculliinae
Noctuoidea genera